Alexander Keiller  (1 December 1889 – 29 October 1955) was a Scottish archaeologist, pioneering aerial photographer, businessman and philanthropist. He worked on an extensive prehistoric site at Avebury in Wiltshire, England, and helped ensure its preservation.

Keiller was heir to the marmalade business of his family, James Keiller & Son that had been established in 1797 in Dundee, and exported marmalade and confectionery across the British Empire. He also pioneered aerial photography for archaeological interpretation.

At Avebury, Keiller founded the Morven Institute of Archeological Research, now the Alexander Keiller Museum. In 1943 he sold the land at Avebury to the National Trust for its agricultural value only.

His fourth wife, Gabrielle Keiller, was also an archaeological photographer, whom he met in connection with Avebury.

Early life and education
Alexander Keiller was born at Binrock House in Dundee on 1 December 1889, the only child of businessman John Mitchell Keiller (1851–1899) and Mary Sime Greig (1862–1907), of the Dundee medical family.

When Keiller was nine, his father died, leaving him the sole heir to the wealth generated by the family's business. He was sent to Hazelwood School at Limpsfield in Surrey and from there went on to Eton College. When he was seventeen, his mother died, and he returned home to administer the family business.

Family life and death
On 2 June 1913, Keiller married Florence Marianne Phil-Morris (1883–1955), the daughter of artist Philip Richard Morris.  They moved into Keiller's house in London. After the First World War, they were divorced.

On 29 February 1924, Keiller married Veronica Mildred Liddell (1900–1964). Veronica shared his interest in archaeology and visited Avebury with him later that year. She was one of the supervisors for the 1925–1929 Windmill Hill excavations, near Avebury, alongside her sister Dorothy Liddell.  Following a separation, Keiller divorced Veronica in 1934.

On 16 November 1938, Keiller married for a third time; his new wife was Doris Emerson Chapman (b. 1901), an artist.  She had joined the Morven Institute of Archaeological Research, founded by Keiller, in 1937. Her contributions in this field include detailed illustrations of the stones as part of the West Kennet Avenue excavations and the creation of visual reconstructions of faces from skulls, four of which were from a burial mound at Chippenham.

He later married a fourth time, to Gabrielle Style (1908–1995).  She lived past his death in 1955, and in 1966 she donated the museum and its contents to the nation.

Keiller died in October 1955, although Piggott's obituary for him wrongly stated September.

Career

In 1913, Keiller funded the establishment of Sizaire-Berwick, an Anglo-French manufacturer of luxury cars.

After the outbreak of the First World War, he joined the Royal Naval Volunteer Reserve as a temporary lieutenant, moving to the Royal Naval Air Service in December 1914. In 1915 he was invalided out of the service, but in 1918 he joined air intelligence, where he remained until the end of the war.

Keiller began to pursue an interest in archaeology. In 1922 he and O. G. S. Crawford undertook an aerial survey of archaeological sites in south western England. This work led to their publication of Wessex from the Air in 1928, which Lynda Murray notes was "the first book of aerial archaeology to be published in the UK".

Using his wealth, Keiller decided to buy nearby Windmill Hill and then undertake excavations there. His work proved that the site was a causewayed enclosure, and it became the monument type-site for decades afterward. He succeeded in getting Tomnaverie stone circle in Aberdeenshire into state guardianship.  In 1934, he began a two-year excavation of the West Kennet Avenue, which led south east from the Avebury stone circle.  As he discovered buried stones, he had them re-erected, and marked the stone-holes with pillars.

Stuart Piggott notes that Keiller "adopted a policy of imaginative but judicious conservation and restoration of the Avebury monuments, and systematically purchased land to preserve these and their surroundings".

Keiller's first major excavation at Avebury was in 1937, the first of three seasons over the ensuing years. Each concentrated on a quadrant of the circle, clearing undergrowth, restoring and conserving the site. Buried stones, some up to a metre below ground, were uncovered and replaced in their original stone-holes.  As with the avenue, he placed concrete pylons to denote missing stones. That same year, he founded the Morven Institute of Archaeological Research.

In 1938 he discovered the famous barber surgeon of Avebury skeleton in the south west quadrant. Keiller opened his museum that year, to display finds from the Windmill Hill, West Kennet, and Avebury excavations.

Keiller leased and restored Avebury Manor & Garden, now a National Trust property consisting of an early 16th-century manor house and its surrounding garden.

The Second World War ended excavations at Avebury. Keiller joined the special constabulary at Marlborough and as his duties left little time for archaeology, he had the museum mothballed.

Legacy

In 1943, Keiller sold his holdings in Avebury to the National Trust for £12,000, simply the agricultural value of the  he had accrued, and not reflecting the immense investment he had made at the site. His excavations at Avebury were unpublished at his death, but were worked up by archaeologist Isobel Smith and published in 1965. In 1966, his widow Gabrielle Keiller donated the Avebury museum and its contents to the nation.

In 1986, UNESCO designated Avebury (together with Stonehenge and associated sites) as a World Heritage Site.  In 2000, it received over 350,000 visitors.

References

Further reading
Murray, Lynda J. (1999) A Zest for Life: the story of Alexander Keiller. Swindon: Morven Books

External links
 

Scottish archaeologists
Scottish philanthropists
1889 births
1955 deaths
Royal Naval Volunteer Reserve personnel of World War I
Royal Navy officers of World War I
People educated at Hazelwood School
People educated at Eton College
Businesspeople from Dundee
Aerial photographers
Scottish aviators
Scottish photographers
Archaeological photographers
People from Dundee
Scottish travel writers
20th-century British philanthropists
Royal Naval Air Service personnel of World War I
20th-century Scottish businesspeople